Sympleurotis wappesi is a species of beetle in the family Cerambycidae. It was described by Julio and Monné in 2005. It is known from Guatemala.

References

Colobotheini
Beetles described in 2005